The DF-3A (NATO: CSS-2) is a Chinese liquid-fueled, single-stage, nuclear medium-range ballistic missile that entered service in 1971.

In 1988 China sold several dozen (reportedly between 36 and 60) DF-3A missiles to Saudi Arabia. Saudi Arabia publicly displayed them for the first time in 2014.

History
Deployment of the missile began in 1971, reaching a peak of 110 by 1984, then shrinking to 50 in 1993. It was estimated by the U.S. DoD that there were 17 missiles and 10 launchers in operation as of 2010 under a single brigade. By May 2014, it appeared that the last unit operating the DF-3A completed conversion to the DF-21 missile from satellite photos of changes to the launch unit site.

Users 
 People's Liberation Army Rocket Force
 Royal Saudi Strategic Missile Force

References

Ballistic missiles of the People's Republic of China
Intermediate-range ballistic missiles
Military equipment introduced in the 1970s